Corpus Christi Church is a Gothic church in Wrocław, Poland. The church is located at the corner of Świdnicka and ul. Bożego Ciała (Corpus Christi Street).

History
The first church was constructed by the Order of Saint John (Bailiwick of Brandenburg). Old Catholic till 1920, now Roman Catholic Parish.

Registered as a landmarked building number 13 of 27.11.1947 and A/289/19 of 23.10.1961.

References

External pages
Corpus Christi Parish

Churches in Wrocław
Gothic architecture in Poland